Elections to Oxford City Council were held on 4 May 2000. One third of the council seats were up for election.  The Labour Party lost its majority on the council to no overall control. The number of Councillors for each party after the election were Labour 21, Liberal Democrat 21, Green 8 and Conservative 1.  Overall turnout was 31.1%

Election result

|}

Ward results

See also
2000 United Kingdom local elections
Elections in the United Kingdom

References

2000
2000 English local elections
2000s in Oxford